No Way Back may refer to:

 No Way Back (1947 film), a Swedish drama film
 No Way Back (1949 film), a British crime film
 No Way Back (1953 film), a West German drama film
 No Way Back (1976 film), a blaxploitation film
 No Way Back (1995 film), an American crime drama
 No Way Back, a 2007 EP by Norther
 "No Way Back"/"Cold Day in the Sun", a 2006 single by the Foo Fighters